Myron is a masculine given name used in English-speaking and Eastern European countries including Romania, Ukraine and Russia (in the countries of the former USSR it is usually spelled Miron, except for Ukraine where Myron is used). Non-religious or Christianized Jews have used this name as a Gentile replacement of the Jewish name Meir.

The name was originally in honor of the ancient Greek sculptor Myron (Greek Μύρων), whose name meant 'myrrh, perfume'. The female equivalent of Myron is considered to be Myra. Among modern Greeks, it may be in honor of Saint Myron, archbishop of Crete (~250–350), and may take the form Myros, with the vocative Myro.

Notable people
Myron, Athenian sculptor from the mid-5th century BC
Myron Allen (1854–1924), American MLB player
Myron Angel (1827–1911), American historian and journalist
Myron Anyfantakis (born 1939), Greek athlete
Myron Arms Hofer (born 1931), American psychiatrist and research scientist
Myron Atkinson (1927–2017), American politician
Myron Augsburger (born 1929), American Mennonite pastor, professor, theologian, and author
Myron Avery (1899–1952), American lawyer, hiker, and explorer
Myron B. Gessaman (1894–1975), American politician and army veteran
Myron B. Williams (c. 1817–1884), American lawyer, politician, and pioneer
Myron Baker (born 1971), American former NFL player
Myron Bell (born 1971), American former NFL player
Myron Benjamin Wright (1847–1894), American politician
Myron Bereza (1936–2012), Canadian international soccer player
Myron Blank (1911–2005), American movie theater chain head and philanthropist
Myron Boadu (born 2001), Dutch professional footballer
Myron Brakke (1921–2007), American biochemist and microbiologist
Myron Brinig (1896–1991), Jewish-American author
Myron Brown (born 1969), American former professional basketball player
Myron Butler (born 1974), American gospel musician, record producer, singer-songwriter, music director, vocalist, organist, and pianist
Myron C. Cramer (1881–1966), American army general
Myron Charles Taylor (1874–1959), American industrialist and diplomat
Myron Cohen (1902–1986), American comedian and raconteur
Myron Cope (1929–2008), American sports journalist, radio personality, and sportscaster
Myron Cottrell, American automobile businessman
Myron Coureval Fagan (1887–1972), American writer, producer, and film- and theater director
Myron Daciuk (1919–1996), Canadian Ukrainian Greek Catholic hierarch
Myron Davis (1919–2010), American photojournalist
Myron Demkiw, Canadian police officer
Myron Donovan Crocker (1915–2010), American district judge
Myron Dorn (born 1954), American senator
Myron Dossett (born 1961), American politician
Myron Dupree (born 1961), American former NFL player
Myron E. Leavitt (1930–2004), American politician
Myron E. Ullman (born 1946), American retail chief executive
Myron E. Witham (1880–1973), American football player, coach of football and baseball, and mathematics professor
Myron Ebell (born 1952/1953), American climate change denier
Myron F. Diduryk (1938–1970), American army major
Myron Fass (1926–2006), American publisher
Myron Fernandes (born 1993), Indian professional footballer
Myron Field, American bridge player
Myron Fink (born 1932), American opera composer
Myron Floren (1919–2005), American accordionist and band leader
Myron Fohr (1912–1994), American racecar driver
Myron Fuller (1889–1949), American football player and coach
Myron Goldfinger, American architect
Myron Goldsmith (1918–1996), American architect and designer
Myron Gordon (disambiguation), several people
Myron Grimshaw (1875–1936), American MLB player
Myron Guyton (born 1967), American former football player
Myron H. Bright (1919–2016), American lawyer and jurist
Myron H. Clark (1806–1892), American politician
Myron H. McCord (1840–1908), American politician, businessman, and military officer
Myron H. Ranney (1845/1846-1910), American Civil War soldier
Myron H. Thompson (born 1947), American district court judge
Myron H. Wilson (1887–1962), American businessman and insurance executive
Myron Healey (1923–2005), American actor
Myron Henry Clark (1881–1953), American chemical engineer, management consultant, college director
Myron Henry Feeley (1885–1976), American-born farmer and Canadian political figure
Myron Henry Phelps (1856–1916), American lawyer and religious writer
Myron Holley (1779–1841), American politician
Myron Holly Kimball (1827–1912), American photographer, real estate speculator, and collector
Myron Hunt (1868–1952), American architect
Myron J. Cotta (born 1953), American Roman Catholic prelate
Myron Jackson (born 1964), American retired NBA player
Myron Just (born 1941), American politician and farmer
Myron Kaufmann (1921–2010), American novelist
Myron Kerstein, American film editor
Myron Kolatch (born 1929), American magazine editor
Myron Korduba (1876–1947), Ukrainian historian, professor, and author
Myron Kowalsky (1941–2022), Canadian politician and teacher
Myron Kulas (born 1942), American politician
Myron Kunin (1928–2013), American businessman and art collector
Myron L. Bender (1924–1988), American biochemist
Myron L. Coulter (1929–2011), American university professor, administrator, and president/chancellor
Myron L. Good (1923–1999), American physicist and professor
Myron L. Weisfeldt (born 1940), American cardiologist and physician-scientist
Myron Lapka (born 1956), American former NFL player
Myron Lawrence (1799–1852), American lawyer and politician
Myron Leskiw (1909–1997), Russian-born American army soldier
Myron Levoy (1930–2019), American author
Myron Lewis (born 1987), American former NFL player
Myron Lizer, American politician and businessman
Myron Lowery, American mayor, politician, and former television news anchor
Myron M. Cowen (1898–1965), American lawyer and diplomat
Myron M. Kinley (1898–1978), American pioneer and firefighter
Myron Magnet (born 1944), American journalist and historian
Myron Markevych (born 1951), Ukrainian former footballer, and current head coach of Metalist Kharkiv
Myron Mathisson (1897–1940), Polish theoretical physicist
Myron McCormick (1908–1962), American stage-, radio-, and film actor
Myron Mendes, Indian professional footballer
Myron Michailidis (born 1968), Greek conductor
Myron Mitchell (born 1998), American football player
Myron Mixon (born 1962), American celebrity chef
Myron N. Dobashi (born 1943), American retired brigadier general
Myron Neth (born 1968), American politician
Myron Nettinga (born 1967), American sound engineer
Myron Newton Morris (1810–1885), American minister and politician
Myron Noodleman (1958–2017), American sports clown
Myron Norton (1822–1886), American attorney and army soldier
Myron of Crete (c. 250-c. 350), Crete bishop
Myron of Priene, Ancient Greek author
Myron Olson (1928–1992), American politician and military personnel
Myron Orfield (born 1961), American law professor
Myron P. Lindsley (1825–1883), American attorney and politician
Myron P. Lotto (1925–2017), American politician
Myron P. Zalucki (born 1954), Australian professor emeritus
Myron "Pinky" Thompson (1924–2001), Hawaiian social worker and community leader
Myron Penn (born 1972), American former lawyer and politician
Myron Pottios (born 1939), American former NFL player
Myron Prinzmetal (1908–1987), American cardiologist
Myron Pryor (born 1986), American former NFL player
Myron Reed (disambiguation), several people
Myron Roderick (1934–2011), American wrestler, head college coach of wrestling and tennis, and college athletics administrator
Myron Rolle (born 1986), Bahamian-American neurosurgeon and former football safety
Myron Rosander (1960–2015), American designer and musician
Myron Rush (1922–2018), American academic
Myron S. Cohen (born 1950), American physician-scientist
Myron S. McNeil (1873–1944), American politician and state senator from Mississippi
Myron Samuel (born 1992), Vincentian international footballer
Myron Samuel Malkin (1924–1994), American physicist and military personnel
Myron Scholes (born 1941), Canadian economist and Nobel Prize winner, a co-author of Black–Scholes model for option pricing
Myron Scott (1907–1998), American businessperson and inventor
Myron Seiliger (1874–1952), Russian physicist and university professor
Myron Selznick (1898–1944), American film producer and talent agent
Myron Sharaf (1926–1997), American writer and psychotherapist
Myron Shongwe (born 1981), South African footballer
Myron Sifakis (born 1960), Greek retired goalkeeper and current football manager
Myron Simpson (born 1990), New Zealand semi-professional road- and track cyclist
Myron Solberg (1930–2001), American food scientist
Myron Spaulding (1905–2000), American sailor, yacht designer and builder, and concert violinist
Myron Stankiewicz (born 1935), Canadian retired NHL and AHL player
Myron Stevens (1901–1988), American racecar driver and builder
Myron Stevens (American football), American college football player
Myron Stolaroff (1920–2013), American author, inventor, and drug researcher
Myron Stout (1908–1987), American abstract painter
Myron Sulzberger (1878–1956), Jewish-American lawyer, politician, and judge
Myron T. Herrick (1854–1929), American banker, diplomat, and politician
Myron T. Steele, American former chief justice and state court judge
Myron Tarnavsky (1869–1938), Ukrainian army supreme commander
Myron Thomas (1916–1987), American coal miner
Myron Thompson (1936–2019), Canadian politician
Myron Tribus (1921–2016), American organizational theorist and educator
Myron Tsosie, American politician
Myron V. George (1900–1972), American politician
Myron van Brederode (born 2003), Dutch professional footballer
Myron W. Krueger (born 1942), American computer artist
Myron W. Wentz (born 1940), American-born Mexican chief executive and microbiologist
Myron W. Whitney (1836–1910), American bass opera singer
Myron Walden (born 1972), American jazz musician
Myron Waldman (1908–2006), American animator and director at Fleischer Studios and Famous Studios
Myron "Mike" Wallace (1918–2012), American television news reporter and anchor for 60 Minutes
Myron Walter "Moe" Drabowsky (1935–2006), American MLB pitcher
Myron Walwyn (born 1972), British Virgin Islands lawyer and politician
Myron Weiner (1931–1999), American political scientist
Myron White (1957–2018), American MLB player
Myron Winslow Adams (1860–1939), American clergyman and educator
Myron Wolf Child (1983–2007), Canadian youth activist, public speaker, and politician
Myron Worobec, Ukrainian-American international footballer

References

External links
 Think Baby Names – Myron

English masculine given names
Ukrainian masculine given names
Given names of Greek language origin